or  or Xe (transliterated as  (DIN-31635),  (Hans Wehr),  (ALA-LC) or  (ISO 233)), is one of the six letters the Arabic alphabet added to the twenty-two inherited from the Phoenician alphabet (the others being , , ,). It is based on the   . South Semitic also kept the phoneme separate, and it appears as South Arabian , Ge'ez  ኀ. Its numerical value is 600 (see Abjad numerals).

When representing this sound in transliteration of Arabic into Hebrew, it is written as ח׳.

The most common transliteration in English is "kh", e.g. Khartoum ( al-Kharṭūm), Sheikh.

 is written is several ways depending in its position in the word:

Character encodings

See also
Arabic phonology
Х, х: Kha (Cyrillic)

Arabic letters
Harm